Agonum gratiosum is a species of ground beetle in the Platyninae subfamily. It is found in Chukotka region, Russia and Kamchatka, and also in Alaska, United States.

References

Beetles described in 1853
Beetles of North America
gratiosum
Taxa named by Carl Gustaf Mannerheim (naturalist)